Mayuri Kango is a former Indian actress from Aurangabad, Maharashtra. She has acted in a number of films, primarily in Bollywood. In 2019, she  joined Google India as the Industry Head.

Acting career
While visiting her mother in Mumbai, she came in contact with director Saeed Akhtar Mirza, who offered her the role of the female protagonist in his film Naseem (1995), a Bollywood film based on the Babri Masjid demolition. First she declined the offer as she had to appear for her HSC board exams. But later, after some discussion with the director, accepted the role.

Mahesh Bhatt was impressed by her performance and offered her the lead role in his next film Papa Kehte Hai (1996). Though the film was not a critical or commercial success, her acting received generally positive reviews. She was later seen in films like Betaabi (1997), Hogi Pyaar Ki Jeet (1999) and Badal (2000). She moved to television appearing in serials Dollar Bahu (2001) and Karishma - The Miracles of Destiny (2003) where she played the daughter of Karishma Kapoor.

Personal life
Kango completed her schooling from Saint Francis De Sales in Aurangabad and was a student at Deogiri College, Aurangabad. Her mother is a noted stage actress, which sparked her interest in acting.

She married an NRI named Aditya Dhillon on 28 December 2003, in Aurangabad. They had a son in 2011.

She later moved to New York with her husband and got an MBA in marketing and finance from Baruch College Zicklin School of Business. She was formerly the Managing Director for Performics, a leading digital media agency a part of the French group Publicis. Currently, she is working as the Industry Head for Google India.

Filmography

Film

Music videos

Television
 Kya Hadsaa Kya Haqeeqat - Kutumb (2004) TV series
 Kya Hadsaa Kya Haqeeqat - Kayamath (2004) TV series
 Karishma – The Miracles of Destiny (2003) TV series as Mansi
 Kkusum (2003) TV series as Saakshi Aaryaman Oberoi (new)
 Kittie Party (2002) TV series
 Rangoli (2001) 
 Dollar Bahu (2001) TV series
 Thoda Gham Thodi Khushi  (2001) TV series as Neha 
Kaahin Kissii Roz - Monica Bose Face Surgery as Sneha
Nargis - DD1

Theatre
 Kuch Tum Kaho Kuch Hum Kahein... Zarina Khanna

References

External links
 

1982 births
Living people
Actresses in Hindi cinema
Actresses from Maharashtra
Indian film actresses
People from Aurangabad, Maharashtra